Moses Reicherson (5 October 1827 – 3 April 1903) was Hebrew grammarian, translator, biblical commentator, and poet.

Selected biography
Reicherson was born in 1827 in Vilna, where he was a childhood friend of J. L. Gordon.

After studying Talmud, Hebrew, and European languages, he became a Hebrew teacher and a proofreader and editor for publishing houses. In 1890 or 1892 he emigrated to New York to be near his son, where he lived in poverty. He worked as a melamed at the Uptown Talmud Torah in Harlem, becoming its principal by 1902.

Work
The literary activity of Reicherson was chiefly in the field of Hebrew grammar.

Along with essays on linguistics in American and European Hebrew journals like Ner ma'aravi, Ha-Ivri, and Ha-teḥiya, Reicherson published poetry in 's literary magazine .

He also wrote He'arot we-tikkunim la-divan, notes on the diwan of Judah ha-Levi (Lyck, 1866). He left a number of works in manuscript, including: Dibre ḥakamim ve-ḥidotam, on Talmudic aggadot; commentaries on the Pentateuch, on the Books of Samuel, Kings, Isaiah, Ezekiel, the Twelve Prophets, Psalms, Job, and Proverbs; a prayer book, Tefillah le-Moshe; a work on Hebrew syntax; and fables, original as well as translations from Gellert.

Bibliography

References

External links
 
 

1827 births
1903 deaths
19th-century American educators
19th-century Lithuanian educators
19th-century educators from the Russian Empire
American school principals
Bible commentators
Emigrants from the Russian Empire to the United States
Folklore writers
Grammarians of Hebrew
Hebrew-language poets
Jewish educators
Lithuanian emigrants to the United States
Lithuanian Jews
Translators to Hebrew
Writers from Vilnius